Miningsby is a small village in the civil parish of Revesby , and the East Lindsey district of  Lincolnshire, England.

Miningsby lies at the southern edge of the Lincolnshire Wolds, a designated Area of Outstanding Natural Beauty.

The village is listed in the 1086 Domesday Book with 48 households, which for the time was considered very large. The Lord of the Manor was Ivo Tallboys.

Miningsby church was dedicated to St Andrew, but was declared redundant by the Diocese of Lincoln on 22 October 1975 and demolished on 14 November 1979, although the churchyard has been retained.

An Anglo-Saxon knotwork stone, which had formerly been in St Andrew's chancel, is now in the City and County Museum, Lincoln.

References

External links

Villages in Lincolnshire
East Lindsey District